John Dahlström (born 22 January 1997) is a Swedish professional ice hockey winger. He is currently playing under contract with IK Oskarshamn of the Swedish Hockey League (SHL).

Playing career
Dahlström made his Swedish Hockey League debut playing with Frölunda HC during the 2014–15 SHL season. He was the last player picked in the 2015 NHL Entry Draft, 211th overall by the Chicago Blackhawks. After two seasons within the SHL, Dahlström opted to play major junior hockey in North America in order to pursue his NHL ambitions. He was drafted 76th overall in the CHL import draft by the Medicine Hat Tigers of the Western Hockey League (WHL) and agreed to a contract on July 22, 2016.

In the 2016–17 season, Dahlström established himself amongst Medicine Hat's scoring lines with 30 goals and 59 points in 63 games. Without a contract offer from the Blackhawks, Dahlström opted to return to Sweden in signing a two-year contract with second tier, Almtuna IS of the HockeyAllsvenskan, on June 22, 2017.

Career statistics

Regular season and playoffs

International

References

External links

1997 births
Living people
Almtuna IS players
Chicago Blackhawks draft picks
Frölunda HC players
IK Oskarshamn players
Medicine Hat Tigers players
People from Kungsbacka
Swedish ice hockey forwards
HC Vita Hästen players
Sportspeople from Halland County